Trench is a surname.

The Trench family supposedly originated in County Galway, Ireland as descendants of Frederic de la Tranche, a 16th-century Huguenot immigrant from Normandy, and his wife Margaret Sutton, a possible Northumbrian. The peerage titles Baron Ashtown, Baron Kilconnel, Baron Trench, Earl of Clancarty, Marquess of Heusden and Viscount Dunlo have been held by various members.

People bearing the surname Trench
Brian Trench (born 1945), Irish writer and academic.
Brinsley Le Poer Trench, 8th Earl of Clancarty
David Clive Crosbie Trench, Governor of Hong Kong 1964-1971
Ernest Crosbie Trench
Fiachra Trench
Francis Chenevix Trench (1805–1886), English divine and author.
Frederick Trench, 1st Baron Ashtown
Frederick Trench, 2nd Baron Ashtown
Frederick Trench, 3rd Baron Ashtown
Frederick Trench (MP for Galway)
Herbert Trench
Martin Edward Trench
Melesina Trench
Nicholas Le Poer Trench, 9th Earl of Clancarty
Power Le Poer Trench (1770–1839), archbishop
Power Henry Le Poer Trench (1841–1899), British diplomat
Nigel Trench, 7th Baron Ashtown
Richard Trench, 2nd Earl of Clancarty
Richard Trench (politician)
Richard Chenevix Trench
Sylvia Trench
William Trench, 1st Earl of Clancarty
William Trench, 3rd Earl of Clancarty
William Trench III
William Le Poer Trench

References

See also
Trench (disambiguation), other uses of the word
, possible including bearers of the surname not listed above

Surnames of Irish origin
Lists of people by surname